Mummy's Pet (1968-1986), was a Thoroughbred race horse by Sing Sing, and out of Money for Nothing.

Life
Mummy's Pet had 11 starts, his big wins consisting of Flying Childers Stakes, Sandown's Temple Stakes, and Ascot's Hyperion Stakes. He was retired to become a breeding stallion in 1972, siring champions in Great Britain, and Ireland.

Mummy's Pet died in 1986 in England.

References 

1968 racehorse births
1986 racehorse deaths
Racehorses bred in the United Kingdom
Racehorses trained in the United Kingdom
Thoroughbred family 1-l